Parral is a city and commune in the Linares Province of Chile's Maule Region.

Geography
Parral borders on the north with the communes of Longaví, Retiro and Colbún (with which it shares a short border in the cordillerana zone); on the west with the commune of Cauquenes (Cauquenes Province); on the south with the commune of Ñiquén and San Fabián and Ñuble Region); and on the east, with the commune of San Fabián.

The river Perquilauquén forms its southern border.

History

Parral was founded in 1795 by the Viceroy of Peru, Ambrosio O'Higgins.  It was originally named Villa Reina Luisa del Parral in honor of the wife of Carlos IV, the King of Spain.

Parral is the birthplace of poet Pablo Neruda, winner of the Nobel Prize in Literature in 1971.

Demography
The city of Parral is the second most populous city in Linares Province with a population of more than 26,000. According to the 2002 census, 26,397 (70.0%) live in urban areas and 11,425 (30.0%) in surrounding rural areas. The ratio of men to women is 101 to 100. Between the census of 1992 and that of 2002, the population of the municipality fell by 0.6% (245 people), exclusively in the rural population; the city of Parral grew by around 1,900 people (7.7%). Parral has welcomed immigration from Italy and Germany.

Administration
As a commune, Parral is a third-level administrative division of Chile administered by a municipal council, headed by an alcalde who is directly elected every four years. The 2008-2012 alcalde is Israel Urrutia Escobar (PDC).

Within the electoral divisions of Chile, Parral is represented in the Chamber of Deputies by Guillermo Ceroni (PPD) and Ignacio Urrutia (UDI) as part of the 40th electoral district, together with Longaví, Retiro, Cauquenes, Pelluhue and Chanco. The commune is represented in the Senate by Hernán Larraín (UDI) and Ximena Rincón González (PDC) as part of the 11th senatorial constituency (Maule-South).

Attractions

Natural and historical attractions in the area include:

The Digua Dam reservoir, a largely undeveloped recreational and fishing area;
The Bullileo Dam reservoir and Laguna de Amargo recreational area;
Fort Viejo, a recreational area and an archaeological site from the time of the Spanish colonization of the Americas (La Conquista);
La Balsa, a recreational area near the Andes, with thermal baths nearby.

See also

References

External links
  Municipality of Parral

Populated places in Linares Province
Communes of Chile
Populated places established in 1795